Count György László Festetics de Tolna (23 April 1815 – 12 February 1883) was a Hungarian politician, who served as Minister besides the King between 1867 and 1871.

Family and ancestors
He was the offspring from the Hungarian noble family count Festetics de Tolna. His father was count  (1785–1846), and his mother was Princess Josefine Hohenzollern-Hechingen (1790-1856). His paternal grandfather was count György Festetics de Tolna (1755-1819), who founded the prestigious agricultural college Georgikon, the first of its kind in Europe, that operated in the Festetics Palace in Keszthely.

On 17 February 1849 he married Countess Eugénia Erdõdy de Monyorókerék et Monoszló (b. November 1826; d. August 1894).

His son was count Tasziló Festetics, 1st Prince Festetics.

Ancestry

References

 Magyar Életrajzi Lexikon
 

1815 births
1883 deaths
Counts of Hungary
Foreign ministers of Hungary
Members of the Hungarian Academy of Sciences
Gyorgy
Politicians from Vienna
Lord-lieutenants of a county in Hungarian Kingdom